Joseph Andrews is a 1977 British period comedy film directed by Tony Richardson. It is based on the 1742 novel Joseph Andrews by Henry Fielding.

With its rollicking comic plot, period costume and setting, ribald adventures and a dashing young hero, the film was an obvious attempt to follow in the line of such films as Tom Jones (1963), which was also directed by Tony Richardson.

Ann-Margret was nominated for a Golden Globe Award in 1978 for her performance in the film.

Vincent Canby of the New York Times explains the pretext of Henry Fielding's novel Joseph Andrews: The book "originated as Fielding's answer to what he saw as the hypocritical pieties of [British novelist] Samuel Richardson's Pamela. In Pamela, which was published in 1740, Richardson told the inspiring tale of Pamela Andrews, a serving girl who tenaciously held onto her virginity until her employer, the rich Mr. Booby, came across with a marriage license. Several years later, Mr. Fielding turned this story wildly upside down in a novel about Pamela's brother, Joseph, a serving boy who is as innocent as his sister but not nearly as calculating, who must fight off all sorts of lewd advances and whose triumph is one of true virtue rather than greed."

Plot
Lady Booby alias "Belle", the lively wife of the fat landed squire Sir Thomas Booby, has a lusty eye on the attractive, intelligent villager Joseph Andrews, a Latin pupil and protégé of parson Adams, and makes him their footman. Joseph's heart belongs to a country girl, foundling Fanny Goodwill, but his masters take him on a trip to fashionable Bath, where spoiled society comes mainly to see and be seen. Sir Thomas really seeks relief for his sick foot, but drowns in the famous Roman baths. The all-but-grieving lady attempts to seduce Joseph, but on finding that his Christian virtue and true love are as immune to her passes as to those of the many ladies who fancy her footman, she fires him. On his way back home on foot, Joseph falls prey to highwaymen who rob him of everything, even the clothes on his back. He is found and nursed by an innkeeper's maid; lusts are stirred at the inn, once more challenging his honour, until he is found by the good parson. Meanwhile, the lady consents to her cousin marrying below his station, on learning that his fiancée is Joseph's sister, Pamela. The parson prevents an attempted rape by a squire, and barely escapes a wicked gentleman's totally unjust justice after being accused of it - he comes to learn of a significant child theft by gypsies. Meanwhile, the parson, Joseph and Fanny again fall prey to the squire's utter debauchery...

Cast

 Ann-Margret as Lady Booby
 Peter Firth as Joseph Andrews
 Michael Hordern as Parson Adams
 Jim Dale as the Pedlar
 Beryl Reid as Mrs. Slipslop
 Natalie Ogle as Fanny Goodwill
 John Gielgud as the Doctor
 Hugh Griffith as Squire Western
 Peter Bull as Sir Thomas Booby
 Karen Dotrice as Pamela
 Peggy Ashcroft as Lady Tattle
 James Villiers as Mr. Booby
 Timothy West as Mr. Tow-Wouse
 Wendy Craig as Mrs. Tow-Wouse
 Ronald Pickup as Mr. Wilson
 Penelope Wilton as Mrs. Wilson
 Kenneth Cranham as The Wicked Squire
 Norman Rossington as Gaffer Andrews
 Patsy Rowlands as Gammer Andrews
 Vernon Dobtcheff as Fop
 Tim Pigott-Smith as Cornet
 Brian Glover as Gaoler

Production
Paramount announced the film in May 1976.

Filming
The movie was filmed on location at Broughton Castle, Banbury, Oxfordshire, England, at the Roman Baths in Bath, Somerset, England, and at the Royal Crescent in Bath, Somerset, England, the George Inn, Norton St Philip and in other locations in England.

Music
The ballads were sung by Jim Dale who plays the gypsy in the movie.

Reception
Vincent Canby of The New York Times was impressed with the film: "Joseph Andrews contains more great (and more greatly funny) character performances than any film I've seen in years. It's one of the few movies around now that truly lifts the spirits, not only because it is so good-humored but also because the humor is laced with so much wit and wisdom. ...(Ann-Margret) looks great and she is enchantingly funny, but so is almost everyone else in a cast so big I really don't know where to begin, since I'm sure to leave out someone important. It's one of those films in which even the smaller roles are as beautifully and as memorably done as the larger ones. ...The film is ... an almost perfect blending of beauty, romance and adventure, of landscapes too lovely to believe alternating with the kind of gritty period detail that prompts one character (Squire Thomas) to say of a street jam in the resort city of Batti, 'The only things that move here are the bowels of the horses.'"

Filmink said Ann-Margret "stole the show".

John Addison's score was well received. The period costumes by Michael Annals are extraordinarily flamboyant. David Watkin's cinematography was praised as clever and particularly reflective of the period depicted, demonstrating a "painterly quality" and an artistic use of lighting.

Awards
 Nominee Best Supporting Actress Golden Globe award (Ann-Margret)
 Nominee Best Costume Design BAFTA award (Michael Annals, Patrick Wheatley)

References

External links
 
 

1977 films
1970s adventure films
1970s historical films
British adventure films
British historical films
1970s comedy thriller films
Films based on British novels
Films based on works by Henry Fielding
Films directed by Tony Richardson
Films scored by John Addison
Paramount Pictures films
United Artists films
1977 comedy films
1970s English-language films
1970s British films